Szklarka Przygodzicka  is a village in the administrative district of Gmina Ostrzeszów, within Ostrzeszów County, Greater Poland Voivodeship, in west-central Poland.

It is the birthplace of Polish high altitude climber Krzysztof Wielicki.

References

Szklarka Przygodzicka